Pseudopostega rotunda is a moth of the family Opostegidae. It is found known from the lowland forest of the La Selva Biological Reserve in north-eastern Costa Rica, the Guanacaste Province in north-western Costa Rica and the Napo Province in east-central Ecuador.

The length of the forewings is 1.9–2.1 mm. Adults are mostly white with white forewings marked with an elongate, slender, brown dorsal spot. Adults are on wing from mid-February to mid-June in Costa Rica and in January in Ecuador.

Etymology
The species name is derived from the Latin rotundus (round) in reference to the diagnostic,
broad, rounded apex of the gnathal lobe in the males of this insect.

External links
A Revision of the New World Plant-Mining Moths of the Family Opostegidae (Lepidoptera: Nepticuloidea)

Opostegidae
Moths described in 2007